Fatehali Palejwala (6 June 1911 – 30 September 1995) was an Indian politician who was the third Speaker of the Gujarat Legislative Assembly.

Palejwala was in office between 19 March 1962 and 17 March 1967. He was the second son of Huseinuddin Nuruddin Palejwala.

References

1911 births
1995 deaths
Speakers of the Gujarat Legislative Assembly
20th-century Indian Muslims
Gujarat MLAs 1962–1967
Indian National Congress politicians
Indian National Congress politicians from Gujarat